Cuba will compete at the 2009 World Championships in Athletics from 15–23 August. A team of 35 athletes was announced in preparation for the competition. Selected athletes have achieved one of the competition's qualifying standards. Triple jumper Yargelis Savigne enters the competition as the reigning World Champion, while Olympic champion and world record holder Dayron Robles aims to gain his first World Championship medal. Decathlete Leonel Suárez is the world leader in his event in the run up to the competition. The three entrants for the men's triple jump are also among the strongest athletes in their event this year.

Team selection

Track and road events

Field and combined events

Results

Men
Track and road events

Field events

Women
Track and road events

Field and combined events

References

External links
Official competition website

Nations at the 2009 World Championships in Athletics
World Championships in Athletics
Cuba at the World Championships in Athletics